This is a list of  Time Team  episodes from series 3.

Episode

Series 3

Episode # refers to the air date order. The Time Team Specials are aired in between regular episodes, but are omitted from this list. Regular contributors on Time Team include: Tony Robinson (presenter); archaeologists Mick Aston, Phil Harding, Carenza Lewis; Robin Bush (historian); Beric Morley (historic buildings); Victor Ambrus (illustrator); Stewart Ainsworth (landscape investigator); John Gater (geophysicist); Henry Chapman (surveyor).

References

External links
Time Team at Channel4.com

Time Team (Series 03)
1996 British television seasons